Mirza Delibašić Cup, formerly Basketball Cup of Bosnia and Herzegovina, is the men's national basketball cup of Bosnia and Herzegovina. It is run by the Basketball Federation of Bosnia and Herzegovina and is named after Bosnian basketball legend and FIBA Hall of Fame member Mirza Delibašić.

History 
There were three separated cup competitions, organized on ethnical principles. In 1998 joint final rounds were organized for the first time, and in 2001, clubs from Republika Srpska took part. Since the 2001–02 season, it is a regular cup competition.

In December 2018, the Basketball Federation of Bosnia and Herzegovina changed the name of the cup to the Mirza Delibašić Cup in honor of Mirza Delibašić.

Title holders 

 1999–00 Borac Banja Luka (Borac Nektar)
 2000–01 Sloboda Tuzla (Sloboda Dita)
 2001–02 Široki (Feal Široki)
 2002–03 Široki (Feal Široki)
 2003–04 Široki (Široki Hercegtisak)
 2004–05 Bosna (Bosna ASA)
 2005–06 Široki (Široki HT Eronet)
 2006–07 Igokea (Igokea Partizan)
 2007–08 Široki (Široki HT Eronet)
 2008–09 Bosna (Bosna ASA BH Telecom)
 2009–10 Bosna (Bosna ASA BH Telecom)
 2010–11 Široki (Široki TT Kabeli)
 2011–12 Široki (Široki WWin)
 2012–13 Igokea
 2013–14 Široki (Široki Primorka)
 2014–15 Igokea
 2015–16 Igokea
 2016–17 Igokea
 2017–18 Igokea
 2018–19 Igokea
 2019–20 Spars (Spars Realway)
 2020–21 Igokea
 2021–22 Igokea
 2022-23 Igokea

Finals

Performance by club

Regional cup tournaments

See also
Basketball Championship of Bosnia and Herzegovina
Basketball Cup of Bosnia and Herzegovina (Women)

Notes

References

External links
 

Basketball competitions in Bosnia and Herzegovina
Basketball cup competitions in Europe
Recurring sporting events established in 1993